Sabalpur is a village of Aligarh district, Uttar Pradesh in Northern India.

Villages in Aligarh district